Herman Mishkin (March 1870 - February 6, 1948) was a Russian-American photographer in Manhattan, New York City. He specialized in photographing opera singers. Mishkin was born in Minsk, Russia in March 1870. He migrated to the United States in 1885. He bought a camera and started taking photographs in the 1880s. He married and had a son, Leo Mishkin. He died on February 6, 1948.

References

External links

1871 births
1948 deaths
Photographers from New York City
People from Manhattan
Emigrants from the Russian Empire to the United States
Artists from Minsk